Geoffrey J. Giles is a historian of Germany and professor emeritus at the University of Florida.

Works

References

Living people
University of Florida faculty
Historians of Germany
Year of birth missing (living people)